MechWarrior is a series of video games set in the fictional universe of BattleTech.

MechWarrior may also refer to:

 MechWarrior (role-playing game), a 1986 role-playing game set in the BattleTech universe
 MechWarrior (1989 video game), the first game in the MechWarrior video game series
 MechWarrior (SNES video game), 1993 video game for the Super Nintendo Entertainment System
MechWarrior, or MechWarrior Online, an online video game reboot of the series

See also